Arthur Marten Skeffington (1890 - 1976) was an American optometrist known to some as "the father of behavioral optometry". Skeffington has been credited as co-founding the Optometric Extension Program with E.B. Alexander in 1928. In the mid-1950s, Skeffington first diagrammed his "four circles" model of describing visual processing.

Honors
The College of Optometrists in Vision Development (COVD) awards the yearly Skeffington Award in his honor, to be awarded to an individual who has made outstanding contributions to optometric literature in the areas of vision therapy and vision development.

Furthermore, there is a yearly Kraskin Invitational Skeffington Symposium on Vision.

References

Further reading
 (abstract)
Sensorimotor Dynamics and Two Visual Systems: Shades of Skeffington & Brock Part 1, The visionhelp blog, 22 May 2011
Earl P. Schmitt: The Skeffington Perspective of the Behavioral Model of Optometric Data Analysis and Vision Care, AuthorHouse, 2006,

External links
The Science of Behavioral Optometry 

1890 births
1976 deaths
American optometrists
Place of birth missing